Jeff Piecoro is an American sportscaster. He formerly worked for 24 years with the Cincinnati Reds baseball team as a co-host on Reds Live pregame and post game shows. He and former Big Red Machine member Doug Flynn co-hosted  Reds Weekly on Fox Sports Ohio. He also does work as the color commentator on the Big Blue Network during radio broadcasts of University of Kentucky Wildcats football on the UK Sports Network.
Since 2015 Piecoro has worked for the SEC Network as play by play announcer for men’s baseball and women’s basketball. In June of 2021 Piecoro became a Realtor at The Brokerage Real Estate Advisors in Lexington. He is a member of LBAR and NKAR, and works the Central Kentucky and Northern Kentucky real estate markets.

Career 
Piecoro attended and played football at Tates Creek High School in Lexington, Kentucky. He walked-on to the football team at the University of Kentucky in 1980 and was a redshirt his freshman year. He began playing in 1981, first under head coach Fran Curci then under Jerry Claiborne for the remainder of his college career. He earned a scholarship during his senior season and ultimately lettered in football. He graduated from UK in 1985 with a degree in telecommunications.

Piecoro started his broadcasting career in Lexington, Kentucky at ABC affiliate WTVQ, later moving to NBC affiliate WLEX, as weekend sports anchor and sports reporter. He has covered the Kentucky Derby and the Breeders' Cup . He has also worked with the Mid-American Conference, Atlantic 10 and Big East as play by play announcer for football and men's basketball. In August 2001, he was selected to be the color commentator for Kentucky football games on what is now known as the UK Sports Network.

He also does work for the Cincinnati Reds baseball team as a co-host for the Reds Live pre-and-post-game shows and as a dugout reporter on team television broadcaster Fox Sports Ohio. In addition to these duties, he hosts the team magazine show  Reds Weekly with former Major League Baseball player and television host Doug Flynn.

Personal life 
Piecoro resides in Northern Kentucky with his children, Nicholas, Olivia and Ali.

See also
 Cincinnati Reds
 Fox Sports Ohio

References

Major League Baseball broadcasters
College football announcers
College basketball announcers in the United States
American television sports announcers
Living people
Kentucky Wildcats football players
Kentucky Wildcats football announcers
Year of birth missing (living people)
Place of birth missing (living people)
Cincinnati Reds announcers
College baseball announcers in the United States
Women's college basketball announcers in the United States